Tourism in Himachal Pradesh relates to tourism in the Indian state of Himachal Pradesh. This is popularly renowned for its Himalayan landscapes and popular hill-stations. Many outdoor activities such as rock climbing, mountain biking, paragliding, ice-skating, trekking, rafting, and heli-skiing are popular tourist attractions in Himachal Pradesh.

Until the British reign, tourism in Himachal Pradesh was very limited to a few places around the hills and some spiritual destinations. The British developed hill stations during their reign one of them being Shimla which they called The Summer Capital of India. After the British rule, tourism in Himachal Pradesh was on the rise with the highest number of tourists in the mid 1980s and 1990s.

Shimla, the state capital, is popular among tourists. The Kalka-Shimla Railway is a mountain railway which is a UNESCO World Heritage Site. Shimla is also a famous skiing attraction in India. Other popular hill stations include Manali, Kinnuar, Kasol, Parvati Valley, Chamba, Kullu, Kinnar Kailesh, and Kasauli.

Dharamshala, home of the Dalai Lama, is known for its Tibetan monasteries and Buddhist temples. Many trekking expeditions also begin here.

The Ridge is a large road in Shimla which is the centre of most cultural activities of Shimla. Annadale is also a major tourist spot in Shimla with an Army Heritage Museum, a Golf Course, helipad and lush green nature.

Bir, located on the west of Joginder Nagar Valley, Kangara District, is the Paragliding Capital of India, attracts numerous tourists for this aerial adventure sport.   As well as being known as the “Paragliding Capital of India,” Bir in Himachal Pradesh is also a well-known destination for ecotourism and a hub for spiritual studies and meditation. With its Tibetan refugee camp, Buddhist monasteries, and large stupa, Bir is renowned for its peaceful atmosphere.’ ‘Bir Billing’ is the collective name for paragliders who take off from Billing and land in Bir village.

Topography 
The Himalayas are found in Himachal Pradesh. The Shivalik range and mid- Himalayas are found here. The highest peak is Reo Purgyil with a height of 6,816m in Kinnaur. Furthermore, there are some reservoirs and rivers in Himachal Pradesh which are tourist hotspots due to water port activities, sacred importance to Hindus, bird watching and have health centres around them. The four major rivers in the state are Ravi, Chenab, Sutlej and Beas. The Sutlej and Beas river valleys are home to hot springs such as Tattapani, Manikaran and Vashisht Temple.

Flora and fauna 

The Great Himalayan National Park is found in the Kullu districts of Himachal Pradesh. It has an area of 620 sq km and ranging from an altitude of 1500 meters to 4500 meters and was created in 1984. There are various forest types found here such as Deodar, Silver Fir, Spruce, Oak and Alpine pastures. In the Great Himalayan National Park, there are a variety of animals found such as Snow Leopard, Himalayan Yak, Himalayan Black Bear, Western Tragopan, Monal and Musk Deer. This National Park is a trail to many hikers and trekkers too. Moreover, there are sanctuaries which are tourist spots such as Naina Devi Sanctuary in Bilaspur district with an area of 120 sq km and Gobind Sagar Sanctuary with an area of 100 sq km. There are animals such as Indian porcupine and giant flying squirrel found here. The Gobind Sagar Lake has fish species such as Mrigal, Silver carp, Katla, Mahaseer and Rohu are found here. Narkanda located in at an altitude of around 8850 feet is known for its apple orchards. It is located between the river valleys of Giri and Sutlej.

Fairs and festivals 
There are a variety of festivals celebrated by the locals of Himachal Pradesh who worship gods and goddesses. There are over 2000 villages in Himachal Pradesh which celebrate festivals such as Kullu Dussehra, Chamba’s Minjar, Renuka ji Fair, Lohri, Halda, Phagli, Lossar and Mandi Shivratri. There approximately 6000 temples in Himachal Pradesh with a known one being Bijli Mahadev. The temple is seen as a 20-meter structure built in stone which, according to locals, is known to attract lighting. They say that this is a way the Gods show their blessings.

Major attractions 
Shimla
 Palampur
 Chail
 Kufri
 Narkanda
 Manali
 Kullu
Joginder Nagar Valley
Baijnath
Rampur
Kinnaur
Sangla
Kalpa
Nako
Chitkul
Reckong Peo
Karsog
Dalhousie
Kangra Valley
Mandi
Rewalsar
Janjehli
Tattapani
 Spiti valley
 Kasol
Tosh
 McLeod Ganj
 Dharamshala
 Kheerganga trek, Parvati Valley
 Bir (Paragliding Capital of India)
 Chamba
 Triund
 Khajjiar
 Seraj valley
Thachi,panjain,banjar

In August 2020 the Himachal Pradesh Government announced that they will be running vistadome buses inside Rohtang tunnel for tourists.

References

 
Himachal Pradesh-related lists